Martti Larni (birth name Martti Johannes Laine) (September 22, 1909 – March 7, 1993) was a Finnish writer. He was the chairman of the Union of Finnish Writers from 1964 to 1967.

Works 
 Seikkailuja Saamenmaassa (1936)
 Kuilu (1937)
 Hyvien ihmisten kylä (1942)
 Arvokkaat köyhät ja heidän kirjava seurakuntansa (1944)
 Kahden maailma (1944)
 Laulun miekka (1944)
 Malttamaton intohimo (1945)
 Äidin kädet (1945)
 Lähellä syntiä (1946)
 Musta Venus (1946)
 Juokseva lähde (1947)
 Taivas laskeutui maahan (1948)
 Musta Venus (1951)
 Minnesota palaa (1952)
 Neljäs nikama eli Veijari vastoin tahtoaan – The Fourth Vertebra, or a Scamp Despite Himself (1957)
 Kaunis sikopaimen eli Talousneuvos Minna Karlsson-Kanasen muistelmia (1959)
 Suomalainen mollikissa (1962)
 Tästä ei puhuta julkisesti (1964)
 Uskomatonta onnea (1966)
 Esikoispoika (1968)
 Sokrates Helsingissä ja muita tarinoita (1972)
 Laugh With Larni (1973)
 Isät äitiyslomalle ja muita tarinoita (1978)

References 

1909 births
1993 deaths
Writers from Helsinki
People from Uusimaa Province (Grand Duchy of Finland)
Finnish writers